Australasian Plant Pathology is a peer-reviewed international journal that publishes original research and critical reviews on phytopathology in the Australasian region. It is published by Springer Science+Business Media in cooperation with the Australasian Plant Pathology Society.

The journal began in 1972 as the APPS Newsletter. In 1978 it was renamed A.P.P. Australasian Plant Pathology, and in 1984 it adopted its current name. As of early 2007 there have been 36 volumes, at six issues per year. According to the Journal Citation Reports, the journal has a 2020 impact factor of 1.599.

References

External links 
 

Botany journals of Australia
Phytopathology
Springer Science+Business Media academic journals
Bimonthly journals
Publications established in 1972
English-language journals